Wide Awake is a 1998 American comedy-drama film written and directed by M. Night Shyamalan and produced by Cathy Konrad and Cary Woods. The film stars Denis Leary, Dana Delany, Joseph Cross, and Rosie O'Donnell.

Plot
During his fifth grade year, ten-year-old Joshua A. Beal begins a personal search to find answers about life and death — a journey triggered by the passing of his beloved grandfather.

Josh attends Waldron Mercy Academy, a private Catholic boys' school in Philadelphia. He says that boys who wear a uniform do not smile much. His best friend Dave is often up to mischief, finding ways to cut class. Small for his age, he often gets picked on.

Very close to his grandfather, he misses him terribly. The adults in his world have not been able to convince him that he is in good hands, so he sets out on a personal mission to find God. 

In their varying ways Josh is guided on his metaphorical journey by Dave and a Philadelphia Phillies-loving nun who teaches at Waldron. Dave creates a distraction so that Josh can sneak into the girls' school to meet the cardinal, who he hopes can help him with his faith. However, seeing him up close makes him see that he's a fragile old man. Josh tries to convince his family to travel to Rome over the winter break, but his parents quickly realise it's part of his quest for God and shoot down his proposal. 

Hope, a girl who helps him in the girls' school, becomes Josh's first crush. They meet again at a boy's birthday party, and he confesses his feelings for her. Another day, when the boys' school is invited to watch a ceremony in which the girls' school offer flowers to the virgen, Hope gives her rose to Josh for his quest.

A series of events happen with Josh's classmates. One oddly kidnaps the school's framed portrait of the pope, his bully has to leave the school for insufficient funds, after getting stuck in a turnstile with Frank he finally agrees to spend time with him and Dave is diagnosed with epilepsy. 

As the academic year comes to an end, he finds his answer in an unexpected way.

Cast

In addition, Julia Stiles appears as Neena Beal, while Michael Craig Bigwood plays the little boy who Joshua learns is an angel.

Production and release
The script was written in 1991. Shyamalan has described Wide Awake as a comedy that he hoped would also make people cry.  The film was made in 1995, but was not released until 1998.

Reception
Wide Awake received mixed reviews from critics. 

Awards and accolades
Wide Awake was nominated for "Best Family Feature – Drama" and "Best Performance in a Feature Film – Leading Young Actor" at the 1999 Young Artist Awards.

References

External links

 Official site
 

1998 films
1990s sports comedy-drama films
American baseball films
1990s English-language films
Films about angels
Religious comedy films
Films directed by M. Night Shyamalan
Films produced by Cathy Konrad
Films shot in Pennsylvania
American sports comedy-drama films
Films with screenplays by M. Night Shyamalan
Miramax films
American children's comedy films
American children's drama films
1990s American films